778 Theobalda is a minor planet orbiting the Sun, in the main asteroid belt. It was discovered by Franz Kaiser on 25 January 1914 and was named after his father, Theobald Kaiser. This is an F-type asteroid that spans ~64 km in girth. The orbital plane is inclined at an angle of 13.7° to the plane of the ecliptic.

778 Theobalda is the namesake and largest member of a family of 128 minor planets in the outer belt.

References

External links 
 
 

Theobalda asteroids
Theobalda
Theobalda
F-type asteroids (Tholen)
19140125